Tony Haddou (born 1989) is a Swedish politician. , he serves as Member of the Riksdag representing the constituency of Gothenburg Municipality.

He was also elected as Member of the Riksdag in September 2022.

References 

Living people
1989 births
Place of birth missing (living people)
Members of the Riksdag from the Left Party (Sweden)
Members of the Riksdag 2018–2022
Members of the Riksdag 2022–2026
21st-century Swedish politicians